Joyce Kennedy (1898–1943) was a British stage and film actress. During the 1930s she appeared in a number of British films playing a mixture of leading and supporting roles.

Selected filmography

Bibliography
 Fearnow, Mark. The American Stage and the Great Depression: A Cultural History of the Grotesque. Cambridge University Press, 1997. 
 Sutton, David R. A chorus of raspberries: British film comedy 1929-1939. University of Exeter Press, 2000.

External links

1898 births
1943 deaths
Actresses from London
British film actresses
British stage actresses
20th-century British actresses
20th-century English women
20th-century English people